The 2021 Conservative Political Action Conference was the annual event of the Conservative Political Action Conference (CPAC), hosted by the American Conservative Union. It was held at the Hyatt Regency Orlando in Orlando, Florida from February 25 to February 28, 2021. The event was headlined by former President Donald Trump, with many speakers and panels throughout the conference.

President Trump's address 
Trump addressed the conference one month after departing office, when on January 20, 2021, Joe Biden was inaugurated as president. He claimed that he had won the 2020 presidential election and suggested he may run for president in 2024.

Entire Speakers List 
The entire lineup of speakers by day listed below:

Friday:
Ron DeSantis,
Mike Lee,
Scott Walker,
James Lankford,
Pam Bondi,
Ted Cruz,
Mo Brooks,
Madison Cawthorn,
Tom Cotton,
Marsha Blackburn,
Matt Gaetz,
Rick Scott,
Josh Hawley, and
Donald Trump Jr

Saturday:
Ken Paxton,
Ric Grenell,
Mike Pompeo,
Bill Hagerty,
Robert Lighthizer,
Devin Nunes,
Cynthia Lummis,
Burgess Owens,
Darrell Issa,
Andy Biggs,
Lauren Boebert,
Kevin McCarthy, and
Kristi Noem

Sunday
Sarah Huckabee Sanders,
Mike Huckabee,
Larry Kudlow, and
President Donald Trump

Stage design controversy
Social media observers noticed and raised concerns over similarities between the CPAC main stage layout and a winged othala rune, which had been used as insignia by two units of the Nazi SS, and more recently by Neo-Nazi organizations.  CPAC chairman Matt Schlapp said comparisons were "outrageous and slanderous". Hyatt issued a statement that it took concerns over the design seriously, but allowed the event to continue after organizers assured them "that any resemblance to a symbol of hate [was] unintentional."  Design firm Design Foundry later took responsibility for the design of the stage, saying that it "intended to provide the best use of space, given the constraints of the ballroom and social distancing requirements."  Ian Walters, director of communications for the ACU and CPAC, said they would stop using Design Foundry.

References

February 2021 events in the United States
Republican Party (United States) events in Florida
2021 in American politics
Donald Trump
Speeches by Donald Trump
2021 in Florida
2020s in Orlando, Florida